St. Mary's Church or Marth Maryam Cathedral is a valiyapally (principal church) of the Syriac Orthodox Church situated in Kothamangalam town in the Ernakulam district of Kerala, India.

It is one of the most ancient Christian churches in India. According to local belief, the church was founded on or before 4th century by a few Syrian Christian families who migrated from Paravur and Angamali. The new church established in AD 1338 by four Syrian Christian merchants who bought the entire land of Kothamangalam from a local chief for commodity trading with the nearby state of Tamil Nadu.

History 

Kothamangalam was a major commercial city during the Portuguese period. The Marth Maryam church at Kothamangalam, commonly known as Valiyapally is the oldest of all the churches in the region. Present Kothamangalam region was historically known as Malakhachira (മാലാഖച്ചിറ, which literally means "Place of the Angel"). The name came from a legend associated with Thomas the Apostle. According to tradition, the Apostle, during his mission in India, stayed in this region where he had a vision of archangel Gabriel who instructed him to establish seven and a half churches in Malankara. 
According to tradition, Mar Yuhannon who represented the Malankara Church at the Holy Synod of Ephesus in AD 431 stayed at Kothamangalam church and had visited Angamaly Church.

Altars 
The altars in the Martha Maryam church are dedicated to the blessed Virgin Mary, Saint George, Saint John the Baptist, and Apostles Saint Peter, Saint Paul and Saint Thomas

Feasts 
The most important festivals of the church are celebrated on 10 February and 15 August.

Holy Soonoro 
A small portion of the Holy Girdle of Saint Mary, rediscovered at the Syriac Orthodox Church at Homs in 1953 by Patriarch of Antioch Ignatius Aphrem I Barsoum, was established in this church In 1980 by the diocesan Metropolitan Thomas Mor Dionysius (The present Catholicos of Malankara).

Historical Events 
All the six Patriarchs of Antioch who had visited Malankara in the last two centuries came to this church as well. The last of these Patriarchal visits was that of Patriarch Ignatius Aphrem II in 2015. It was during such a visit that Patriarch Ignatius Zakka Iwas I had ordained an assistant metropolitan for the diocese by name Mor Severios Abraham, at the Kothamangalam Cheriapally. 
As per the biography of Saint Gregorios of Malankara written by Mookencheril Paily Varkey in 1903, Palakunnath Mathews Mar Athanasius ordained St. Gregorios of Parumala as Korooyo in this church in 1858.
From 1974 to 1997, the building adjacent to the Valiyapally was the bishop's residence of the diocesan Metropolitan.

Gallery

See also 

 Marthoma Cheriapally Kothamangalam
 Saint Mary Church of the Holy Belt

References 

</ref>

Syriac Orthodox churches in India
Soonoro churches in Kerala
Syriac Orthodox cathedrals
Churches in Kothamangalam
Oriental Orthodox cathedrals in India
Churches completed in 1338
14th-century churches in India
14th-century Oriental Orthodox church buildings